The Cotmeana is a left tributary of the river Vedea in Romania. It discharges into the Vedea in Bădești. The following towns and villages are situated along the river Cotmeana, from source to mouth: Cotmeana, Bărbătești, Cocu, Păduroiu din Vale, Găinușa, Lipia, Drăghicești, Popești, Turcești, Bănărești, Lunca Corbului, Pădureți, Catane, Ciești, Fâlfani, Cotmeana, Izbășești, Cochinești, Stolnici, Vlășcuța, Hârsești, Ciobani, Martalogi, Urlueni, Malu, Ciocești, Șelăreasca, Bârla and Bădești.

References

Rivers of Romania
Rivers of Argeș County